Rhea Bailey (born 12 July 1983) is a British actress. She is the younger sister of singer Corinne Bailey Rae. Her father is Kittitian and her mother is English. She is best known for her roles as PC Mel Ryder in The Bill between 2008 and 2010, and Caz Hammond in Coronation Street in 2015 and 2016.

Her other television roles include Chloe Simms on the soap opera Crossroads, former student Yasmin Deardon in BBC school drama Waterloo Road, Jade in the Torchwood episode "Out of Time", Jazz in the movie Credo (also known as The Devil's Curse) and DC Lisa Goodall in the ITV series Blue Murder.

Filmography

Films

TV

References

External links

1983 births
Black British actresses
English people of Saint Kitts and Nevis descent
English television actresses
Living people
Actresses from Leeds
21st-century English actresses